Murder on the Roof is a 1930 American Pre-Code mystery film directed by George B. Seitz.

Cast
 Dorothy Revier as Molly
 Raymond Hatton as Drinkwater
 Margaret Livingston as Marcia
 David Newell as Ted Palmer
 Paul Porcasi as Joe Carozzo
 Virginia Brown Faire as Monica
 William V. Mong as Anthony Sommers
 Louis Natheaux as Victor
 Fred Kelsey as Ryan
 Richard Cramer as Joe Larkin

References

External links

1930 films
1930 mystery films
American black-and-white films
American mystery films
Columbia Pictures films
Films directed by George B. Seitz
Films with screenplays by F. Hugh Herbert
1930s American films
1930s English-language films